The 2010 NHRA Full Throttle Drag Racing Season ran from February 11 to November 14, 2010. A variety of new safety rules were implemented following the conclusion of the investigation of the Scott Kalitta death in 2008. The NHRA had planned on returning Top Fuel and Funny Car classes to  distances; however, racing in those classes remained at  distance to contain costs with the United States economy still in recession, as well as to address ongoing safety concerns.

There were 23 Top Fuel, Funny Car, and Pro Stock car events, and 17 Pro Stock Motorcycle events.

Schedule
With the closure of the Memphis Motorsports Park as of 30 October 2009, the Full Throttle Series is now slated for 23 events:
The Virginia NHRA Nationals has also been eliminated, as Virginia Motorsports Park chose to align with rival Kenneth Feld's International Hot Rod Association instead (many tracks changed sanctioning, owing to their sportsman classes).  A second race at zMax Dragway, the Four Wide Nationals, was added.

1 Saturday race.  As the Arizona Pro Stock eliminations were abandoned after one round, the remaining rounds were conducted during Gainesville on Saturday.

2 The rules for the Four Wide Nationals differ from other races:
 All cars will qualify on each lane as all four lanes will be used in qualifying.
 Three rounds with cars using all four lanes.
 In Rounds One and Two, the top two drivers (of four) will advance to the next round.
 The pairings are set as follows:
 Race One:  1, 8, 9, 16
 Race Two:  4, 5, 12, 13
 Race Three:  2, 7, 10, 15
 Race Four:  3, 6, 11, 14
 Semifinal One:  Top two in Race One and Race Two
 Semifinal Two:  Top two in Race Three and Race Four
 Finals:  Top two in Semifinal One and Semifinal Two
 Lane choice determined by times in previous round.  In first round, lane choice determined by fastest times.
 Drivers who advance in Rounds One and Two will receive 20 points for each round advancement.
 In Round Three, the winner of the race will be declared the race winner and will collect 40 points.  The runner-up will receive 20 points.  Third and fourth place drivers will be credited as semifinal losers.

Point standings

Notable events
After 47 years as a driver and owner, Don Prudhomme announced his retirement from the series.

Funny car driver Mike Neff stepped down as driver to become co-crew chief for John Force, the other crew chief is Austin Coil.

In the first round at Arizona, Antron Brown lost a wheel and crashed into the wall. Although Brown was uninjured in the accident, the wheel struck a female spectator who was killed.  Because of weather conditions, the Pro Stock event at the same meet was cancelled after one round.  The eight first-round winners competed as part of second-round qualifying at the next round.

Just two days after John Force won a record 15th Funny Car world championship, his crew chief, NHRA Hall of Fame member Austin Coil, resigned from John Force Racing. In his announcement, Coil stated he wanted to take at least a year off, but left the door open to a return to racing in 2012.

References

External links
 Official website
 Official NHRA Drag Racing Podcasts
 Drag Race Central The Latest NHRA News and Analysis

NHRA Camping World Drag Racing Series
NHRA Full Throttle